William Fletcher may refer to:

William Fletcher (Irish judge) (1750–1823), Irish politician and justice of the Court of Common Pleas
William Fletcher (valet) (c. 1775–1839), servant of Lord Byron
William A. Fletcher (Michigan judge) (1788–1852), Chief Justice of the Michigan Supreme Court
William Fletcher (English politician) (1831–1900), British Member of Parliament for Cockermouth, 1879–80
William Roby Fletcher (1833–1894), English-born Australian Congregational minister and Vice-Chancellor of the University of Adelaide
William I. Fletcher (1844–1917), American librarian, bibliographer and indexer
William Fletcher (engineer) (1848–1918), British author and steam traction engine designer
William Fletcher (rugby union) (1851–1895), English rugby international
William Fletcher (priest) (died 1926), Welsh Anglican priest
William Bartlett Fletcher Sr. (1862–1957), admiral in the United States Navy
William Fletcher (cricketer) (1866–1935), English cricketer for Yorkshire
William Fletcher (rower) (1869–1919), English rower and coach
William Fletcher (physician) (1872–1938), English doctor
William Whigham Fletcher (1918–2001), Scottish botanist
William Thomas Fletcher (born c. 1935), American mathematician
William A. Fletcher (born 1945), United States federal appeals court judge
Will Fletcher (born 1989), British rower

Fictional characters
Billy Fletcher, a fictional character in the British soap opera Emmerdale
Will Fletcher (The Bill), a fictional character in The Bill